Abdelilah may refer to:

Abdelilah al-Khatib (born 1953), former Minister of Foreign Affairs for Jordan
Abdelilah Abdul-Wahid , (born 1956), former Iraq national player
Abdelilah Bagui (born 1978), former Moroccan footballer
Abdelilah Basbousi, Moroccan actor
Abdelilah Benkirane (born 1954), Prime Minister of Morocco from November 2011 to March 2017
Abdelilah Fahmi (born 1973), Moroccan former football defender
Abdelilah Galal (born 1986), Egyptian footballer
Abdelilah Hafidi (born 1992), Moroccan professional footballer
Abdelilah Hamdouchi (born 1958), Moroccan writer
Abdelilah Haroun (1997–2021), Qatari track and field sprinter
Abdelilah Mohammed Hassan (1934–2022), Iraq football coach, managed the Iraq national team
Abdelilah Madkour, Moroccan professional footballer
Abdelilah Saber (born 1974), Moroccan retired footballer

See also
'Abd al-Ilah
Abdella (disambiguation)
Abdul Ali